Henry Philip Hynoski Sr. (born May 30, 1953) is a former American football running back who played one season with the Cleveland Browns of the National Football League. He was drafted by the Cleveland Browns in the sixth round of the 1975 NFL Draft. He played college football at Temple University and attended Mount Carmel High School in Mount Carmel, Pennsylvania.

References

External links
Just Sports Stats
College stats

Living people
1953 births
Players of American football from Pennsylvania
American football running backs
Temple Owls football players
Cleveland Browns players
People from Mount Carmel, Pennsylvania